Luciana Guindani (July 27, 1937 – January 2, 2020) was an Italian sprint canoer who competed in the early 1960s. She finished seventh in the K-2 500 m event at the 1960 Summer Olympics in Rome.

References
Luciana Guindani's profile at Sports Reference.com
Luciana Guindani's obituary 
Luciana Guindani’s Olympedia information

1937 births
2020 deaths
Canoeists at the 1960 Summer Olympics
Italian female canoeists
Olympic canoeists of Italy